Conewango Township is a township in Warren County, Pennsylvania, United States. The population was 3,401 at the 2020 census, down from 3,594 at the 2010 census. 3,915 at the 2000 census.

Geography

Demographics

As of the census of 2000, there were 3,915 people, 1,526 households, and 1,069 families residing in the township.  The population density was 130.6 people per square mile (50.4/km2).  There were 1,659 housing units at an average density of 55.4/sq mi (21.4/km2).  The racial makeup of the township was 97.73% White, 0.61% African American, 0.26% Native American, 0.41% Asian, 0.05% Pacific Islander, 0.38% from other races, and 0.56% from two or more races. Hispanic or Latino of any race were 0.59% of the population.

There were 1,526 households, out of which 28.4% had children under the age of 18 living with them, 57.1% were married couples living together, 9.2% had a female householder with no husband present, and 29.9% were non-families. 25.9% of all households were made up of individuals, and 10.8% had someone living alone who was 65 years of age or older.  The average household size was 2.37 and the average family size was 2.83.

In the township the population was spread out, with 21.4% under the age of 18, 6.4% from 18 to 24, 28.5% from 25 to 44, 26.7% from 45 to 64, and 16.9% who were 65 years of age or older.  The median age was 42 years. For every 100 females, there were 99.1 males.  For every 100 females age 18 and over, there were 96.3 males.

The median income for a household in the township was $42,690, and the median income for a family was $48,818. Males had a median income of $36,230 versus $21,463 for females. The per capita income for the township was $18,823.  About 4.6% of families and 6.9% of the population were below the poverty line, including 14.0% of those under age 18 and 4.5% of those age 65 or over.

References

Townships in Warren County, Pennsylvania
Townships in Pennsylvania